Mount Shasta Ski Park is a ski resort located in northern California which has winter and summer operations. Winter operations include skiing & snowboarding, tubing, a backcountry cabin program, lessons, rentals, and events. In the summer they offer Scenic Chairlift Rides, Mountain Biking, and Disc Golf. They are located east of Interstate 5 along SR 89 between the city of Mount Shasta and the town of McCloud. It straddles several small volcanic buttes on the lower southern flanks of the massive stratovolcano, with 3 triple chairlifts running to the top of Coyote Butte- , Douglas Butte- , and Marmot Ridge-  and 1 Quad chairlift on Grey Butte-  Along with 2 magic carpets, one for tubing and one for learning to ski and snowboard. With a total skiable area of 636 acres and 38 conventional trails.

History
The Ski Park was the second ski area constructed on Mount Shasta, but the only one which now survives. However, the ski area had often been in financial trouble over the next two decades, and a massive avalanche in January 1978 which destroyed the main chairlift was the finishing blow. The Ski Bowl closed permanently after that, and there was no more lift-served skiing on Mount Shasta until 1985, when local businessmen and developers finally began construction of a new ski area lower down on the mountain, in an area well below timberline and safe from avalanches. Starting with Marmot Ridge and Douglas Butte chairlifts. Then later the Coyote Butte lift. The Mt Shasta Ski Park opened on December 14, 1985, and has been successfully operating for 37 years since then. In December 2022 a brand new quad chairlift opened on Grey Butte expanding the park. Adding 7 new runs, including the parks first double diamond run. The ski area is located entirely on  double section inholding of private land within the checkerboard pattern of the Shasta-Trinity National Forest, and road access is via Forest Route 88 across national forest land.

References

External links

Mount Shasta Ski Park official site
Mount Shasta Avalanche Center (USDA Forest Service)
Ski Lifts.org photos of lifts at Mount Shasta Ski Park

Mount Shasta
Ski areas and resorts in California
Buildings and structures in Siskiyou County, California
Tourist attractions in Siskiyou County, California
Shasta-Trinity National Forest